Oklahoma Tribal Statistical Area is a statistical entity identified and delineated by federally recognized American Indian tribes in Oklahoma as part of the U.S. Census Bureau's 2010 Census and ongoing American Community Survey. 
Many of these areas are also designated Tribal Jurisdictional Areas, areas within which tribes will provide government services and assert other forms of government authority.
They differ from standard reservations, such as the Osage Nation of Oklahoma (not listed below), in that allotment was broken up and as a consequence their residents are a mix of native and non-native people, with only tribal members subject to the tribal government.
At least five of these areas, those of the so-called five civilized tribes of Cherokee, Choctaw, Chickasaw, Creek and Seminole (the 'Five Tribes' of Oklahoma), which cover 43% of the area of the state (including Tulsa), are recognized as reservations by federal treaty, and thus not subject to state law or jurisdiction for tribal members.

List
5 Tribes (Reservations)
 Cherokee Nation
 Chickasaw Nation
 Choctaw Nation
 Creek Nation (Muscogee)
 Seminole Nation
Other
 Caddo-Wichita-Delaware OTSA
 Cheyenne-Arapaho OTSA
 Citizen Potawatomi Nation-Absentee Shawnee OTSA
 Eastern Shawnee OTSA
 Iowa OTSA
 Kaw OTSA
 Kickapoo OTSA
 Kiowa-Comanche-Apache-Fort Sill Apache OTSA
 Miami OTSA
 Modoc OTSA
 Otoe-Missouria OTSA
 Ottawa OTSA
 Pawnee OTSA
 Peoria OTSA
 Ponca OTSA
 Quapaw OTSA
 Sac and Fox OTSA
 Seneca-Cayuga OTSA
 Tonkawa OTSA
 Wyandotte OTSA

Joint Use Areas 
 Creek–Seminole JUA OTSA
 Kaw–Ponca JUA OTSA
 Kiowa–Comanche–Apache–Fort Sill–Caddo–Wichita–Delaware JUA OTSA
 Miami–Peoria JUA OTSA

See also

List of Native American Tribes in Oklahoma
List of historical Indian reservations in the United States
Indian colony
Indian reserve, Canada
Oklahoma Indian Welfare Act
Ranchería
Rancherie, Canada
Aboriginal title in the United States
Former Indian reservations in Oklahoma
Indian country jurisdiction
Off-reservation trust land
Tribal sovereignty in the United States

References

External links
Oklahoma Office of Indian Affairs Commission

Aboriginal title in the United States
 02
 02
Political divisions of the United States
United States statistical areas
Former American Indian reservations